The following is a timeline of the expansion and evolution of franchises in the National Basketball Association (NBA). The league was formed as the Basketball Association of America (BAA) in 1946 and took its current name in 1949. The histories of NBA franchises that were also members of the American Basketball League (ABL), National Basketball League (NBL), National Pro Basketball League (NPBL), and American Basketball Association (ABA) are also included.

NBA timeline

History of organizational changes

The following is a history of the organizational changes in the NBA, including contractions, expansions, relocations, and divisional realignment since the founding of the BAA in 1946.

BAA years (1946–1949)

1946: Founding of the BAA
The Basketball Association of America is formed with 11 teams, and divided into East and West divisions. Four of these teams fold after the season.

1947
The BAA plays with eight teams, with the Baltimore Bullets joining the league from the ABL.

1948
Four teams from the NBL, the Fort Wayne Pistons, Indianapolis Jets, Minneapolis Lakers and the Rochester Royals, join the BAA. Both the Jets and the Providence Steamrollers fold after the season.

BAA–NBL merger (1949–1966)

1949: BAA–NBL merger
The ten surviving BAA teams merge with the six remaining teams from the NBL to form the NBA. The Indianapolis Olympians also join the merged league as an expansion team. The merged NBA realigns into three divisions.

1950 contraction
The NBA contracts to 11 teams, and realigns back to East and West divisions, after three clubs fold and three other teams jump to the NPBL. The Washington Capitols then also fold midway through the season.

1951: Hawks relocation to Milwaukee
The Tri-Cities Blackhawks move to Milwaukee to become the Milwaukee Hawks.

1953 and 1954 contraction
The league contracts to nine teams for the 1953–54 season after the Indianapolis Olympians fold. The Baltimore Bullets then fold 14 games into the 1954–55 season.

1955: Hawks relocation to St. Louis
The Milwaukee Hawks move to St. Louis to become the St. Louis Hawks.

1957: Pistons and Royals relocation
 The Fort Wayne Pistons move to Detroit to become the Detroit Pistons.
 The Rochester Royals move to Cincinnati to become the Cincinnati Royals.

1960: Lakers relocation to Los Angeles
The Minneapolis Lakers move to Los Angeles to become the Los Angeles Lakers.

1961 expansion
The Chicago Packers are enfranchised and are placed in the West Division, bringing the league back to nine teams.

1962: Warriors relocation and Chicago renaming
 The Philadelphia Warriors relocate to San Francisco to become the San Francisco Warriors. This results in the Warriors moving to the West Division, and the Cincinnati Royals moving to the East Division.
 The Chicago Packers are renamed the Chicago Zephyrs.

1963 relocations
 The Chicago Zephyrs move to Baltimore to become the new Baltimore Bullets.
 The Syracuse Nationals move to Philadelphia to become the Philadelphia 76ers.

Expansion era (1966–1988)

1966 expansion
The Chicago Bulls are enfranchised and are placed in the West Division, while the Baltimore Bullets move to the East Division.

1967 expansion
The San Diego Rockets and the Seattle SuperSonics are enfranchised, bringing the league to 12 teams. Both expansion teams are placed in the West Division while the Detroit Pistons move to the East Division.

1968 expansion and relocation
 The Milwaukee Bucks and the Phoenix Suns are enfranchised, bringing the league to 14 teams. The Bucks are placed in the East Division and the Suns in the West Division.
 The St. Louis Hawks move to Atlanta to become the Atlanta Hawks, but still stay in the West Division.

1970 expansion and realignment
The NBA expands to 17 teams with the Buffalo Braves, the Cleveland Cavaliers, and the Portland Trail Blazers. The league realigns into four divisions and two conferences.

1971: Relocation of the Rockets and Warriors
 The San Diego Rockets relocate to Houston to become the Houston Rockets.
 The San Francisco Warriors become the Golden State Warriors after the team moves across San Francisco Bay to Oakland.

1972: Royals relocation to Kansas City-Omaha
The Cincinnati Royals relocate and became the Kansas City–Omaha Kings, splitting their home games between Kansas City, Missouri and Omaha, Nebraska. This results in the Kings moving to the Midwest Division, the Houston Rockets moving to the Central, and the Phoenix Suns moving to the Pacific.

1973: Bullets relocation
The Baltimore Bullets become the Capital Bullets after they move to the Washington, D.C. suburb of Landover, Maryland.

1974 expansion
 The New Orleans Jazz are enfranchised as the league's 18th team and are placed in the Central Division
 The Capital Bullets are renamed the Washington Bullets.

1975: Kings play in Kansas City full-time
The Kansas City–Omaha Kings are renamed the Kansas City Kings after they decide to play in Kansas City full-time.

1976 ABA–NBA merger
The ABA–NBA merger. Four American Basketball Association franchises join the NBA: the Denver Nuggets, the Indiana Pacers, the New York Nets, and the San Antonio Spurs.

1977: Nets relocation to New Jersey
The New York Nets move to Piscataway, New Jersey to become the New Jersey Nets.

1978: Braves relocation to San Diego
The Buffalo Braves relocate to San Diego to become the San Diego Clippers. This results in the Clippers moving to the Pacific Division, the Detroit Pistons moving to the Central, and the Washington Bullets moving to the Atlantic.

1979: Jazz relocation to Utah
The New Orleans Jazz relocate to Salt Lake City, Utah to become the Utah Jazz. This results in the Jazz moving to the Midwest Division and the Indiana Pacers moving to the Central.

1980 expansion and realignment
The Dallas Mavericks are enfranchised as the league's 23rd team, and are placed in the Midwest Division. The NBA's two other Texas teams, the Houston Rockets and the San Antonio Spurs, move to the Midwest Division to join the Mavericks, while the Chicago Bulls and the Milwaukee Bucks move to the Central Division.

1984: Clippers relocation to Los Angeles
The San Diego Clippers move to Los Angeles to become the Los Angeles Clippers.

1985: Kings relocation to Sacramento
The Kansas City Kings move to Sacramento, California to become the Sacramento Kings.

Modern expansion era (1988–present)

1988 expansion
The Charlotte Hornets and the Miami Heat are enfranchised to bring the league to 25 teams. The Hornets are placed in the Atlantic Division, the Heat in the Midwest Division, and the Sacramento Kings move to the Pacific Division.

1989 expansion
The Minnesota Timberwolves and the Orlando Magic are enfranchised as the league's 26th and 27th teams. The Timberwolves are placed in the Midwest Division, the Magic in the Central Division, the Charlotte Hornets move to the Midwest Division, and the Miami Heat move to the Atlantic Division.

1990: The Hornets and the Magic switch conferences
The Charlotte Hornets move to the Central Division, while the Orlando Magic move to the Midwest Division.

1991: The Magic moves back to the Eastern Conference
The Orlando Magic move to the Atlantic Division to reduce travel after spending the previous season in the Western Conference.

1995 expansion
The NBA expands into Canada as the Toronto Raptors and Vancouver Grizzlies are enfranchised as the league's 28th and 29th teams. The Raptors are placed in the Central Division and the Grizzlies are placed in the Midwest Division.

1997: Washington renaming
The Washington Bullets are renamed the Washington Wizards.

2001: Grizzlies relocation to Memphis

The Vancouver Grizzlies move to Memphis, Tennessee to become the Memphis Grizzlies.

2002: Hornets relocation to New Orleans
The Charlotte Hornets move to New Orleans to become the New Orleans Hornets.

2004 expansion and realignment
The Charlotte Bobcats are enfranchised as the league's 30th team. The NBA realigns to create three divisions with five teams each in both conferences. The New Orleans Hornets are the only team to switch conferences, moving from the Eastern Conference to the Western Conference.

2005: Hurricane Katrina impacts the Hornets

Due to the damages caused by Hurricane Katrina, the Hornets split their home games between New Orleans and Oklahoma City for two seasons, and thus officially play as the New Orleans/Oklahoma City Hornets.

2007: Hornets return to New Orleans full-time
With damages caused by Hurricane Katrina fully repaired, the Hornets return to New Orleans full-time.

2008: SuperSonics relocation to Oklahoma City

The Seattle SuperSonics move to Oklahoma City to become the Oklahoma City Thunder.

2012: Nets relocation 
The New Jersey Nets move to Brooklyn to become the Brooklyn Nets.

2013: New Orleans renaming 
The New Orleans Hornets are renamed the New Orleans Pelicans.

2014: Charlotte renaming 
The Charlotte Bobcats are renamed the Charlotte Hornets after the New Orleans Pelicans agree to return the original Charlotte Hornets' name, history, and records from 1988 to 2002 to the City of Charlotte.

See also
 Timeline of the National Football League
 Timeline of Major League Baseball
 History of organizational changes in the NHL

References

Sources

National Basketball Association history
National Basketball Association